Springfield High School in Springfield, Louisiana, is a co-educational public high school under the Livingston Parish School Board. The school currently serves 361 students from the communities of Springfield and Killian in Livingston Parish, Louisiana.  Principal is Spencer Harris.  Colors are Royal blue and White.

History

The earliest known record of a graduating class was the Class of 1923, in which two males and three females were among the honorees. The original school buildings were burned down sometime in the 1970s. The only building that remained largely intact was the modern "3rd Hall" structure.

Academics
The Average ACT Score is a 24 and the graduation rate is 92% amongst students from 9-12 grade.

Athletics
Springfield High competes as a member of the Louisiana High School Athletic Association (LHSAA) Class 2A. The School's Mascot is a Bulldog and the teams are referred to as the "Bulldogs" and the "Lady Bulldogs".

Championships
Boys' Basketball
(2) State Championships: 1982, 1997

The Springfield High School Boys Basketball team has appeared in the Louisiana Class 2A Boys Basketball State Championship Game three times, winning in 1982 and 1997.

Football
Springfield High Football began in 1965.

References

 https://web.archive.org/web/20151112214811/http://www.14-0productions.com/LHSAA_Boys_Basketball.html  Boys Basketball Championships
 http://www.oncoursesystems.com/school/webpage/11568553  Springfield High's Website
 https://www.usnews.com/education/best-high-schools/louisiana/districts/livingston-parish/springfield-high-school-8673  U.S. News Report on Springfield High
 http://www.lhsaa.org/sports/brackets-results/football Link to LHSAA Football Playoff Brackets (Class 2A- Springfield)

Schools in Livingston Parish, Louisiana
Public high schools in Louisiana